The 2010 Oceanian Youth Athletics Championships were held at the Sydney Olympic Park Athletic Centre in Homebush, New South Wales, Australia, between March 11–14, 2010.  They were held together with the 2010 Australian Junior Athletics Championships (U14 to U20).
A total of 42 events were contested, 21 by boys and 21 by girls. 
Two highlights of the games were u20 boy athlete Damien Birkenhead winning the shot put with a throw of 21.72m and u18 girl athlete Sarah Jackson winning the 400m sprint in a time of 53:61 seconds.

Medal summary
Complete results can be found on the websites of the Oceania Athletics Association, and of the World Junior Athletics History webpage.

Boys under 18 (Youth)

Girls under 18 (Youth)

Medal table (unofficial)

Participation (unofficial)
An unofficial count yields the number of about 383 athletes from 18
countries. 309 athletes were from the 8 Australian States and Territories:

and 74 athletes from 17 other OAA member and associate member countries:

 (2)
 (2)
 (7)
 (5)
 (4)
 (2)
 (1)
 (1)
 (2)
 (6)
 (29)
 (3)
 (2)
 (3)
 (3)
 (1)
 (1)

References

Oceania Youth Athletics Championships
International athletics competitions hosted by Australia
Oceania Youth Athletics Championships
Oceania Youth Athletics Championships
Youth sport in Australia
Oceania Youth Athletics Championships
March 2010 sports events in Australia